The Beestonian Stage is an early Pleistocene stage used in the British Isles. It is named after Beeston Cliffs near West Runton in Norfolk where deposits from this stage are preserved. 

The Beestonian precedes the Cromerian Stage and follows the Pastonian Stage. This stage consists of alternating glacial and interglacial phases instead of being a continuous glacial epoch. It is equivalent to Marine isotope stages 22 to (60?). The Beestonian Stage and Marine Isotope Stage 22 ended about 866,000 years ago.

The Beestonian corresponds temporally to the Danube Stage in the glacial history of the Alpine region. Based on finding in the Low Countries, the corresponding stage in northern continental Europe is divided into four stages, the Bavelian, Menapian, Waalian, and Eburonian.

The Beestonian had also been equated to the Nebraskan glaciation in North America. However, the Nebraskan Stage, along with the Kansan and Aftonian Stages, have been abandoned by North American Quaternary geologists and merged into the Pre-Illinoian Stage. At this time, the Beestonian stage is correlated with the period of time, which includes the Pre-Illinoian F, Pre-Illinoian G, and Pre-Illinoian H glaciations of North America.

See also
Ice age
Glacial period
Timeline of glaciation
 Pleistocene, which covers:

References

Further reading
Bowen, D.Q., 1978, Quaternary geology: a stratigraphic framework for multidisciplinary work.  Pergamon Press, Oxford, United Kingdom. 221 pp. 
Ehlers, J., P. L. Gibbard, and J. Rose, eds., 1991, Glacial deposits in Great Britain and Ireland. Balkema, Rotterdam. 580 pp 
Mangerud, J., J. Ehlers, and P. Gibbard, 2004, Quaternary Glaciations: Extent and Chronology 1: Part I Europe, Elsevier, Amsterdam.  
Sibrava, V., Bowen, D.Q, and Richmond, G.M., 1986, Quaternary Glaciations in the Northern Hemisphere, Quaternary Science Reviews, vol. 5, pp. 1-514.

External links
Aber, J.S., 2006, Regional Glaciation of Kansas and Nebraska ,  Emporia State University, Emporia, Kansas.
anonymous, 2000, Pre-Wisconsin Glaciation of Central North America, Work Group on Geospatial Analysis of Glaciated Environments (GAGE), INQUA Commission on Glaciation, Emporia State University, Emporia, Kansas.
anonymous, 2007, Global correlation tables for the Quaternary, Subcommission on Quaternary Stratigraphy, Department of Geography, University of Cambridge, Cambridge, England.

Glaciology
History of climate variability and change
Pleistocene